The Penobscot River Bridge was a truss bridge between Bangor and Brewer, Maine. It was constructed by the American Bridge Company in 1902, with further construction in 1911 by the Boston Bridge Works. According to the Historic American Engineering Record, it was the last remaining Baltimore (Petit) through-truss bridge in Maine. While it was designed for loads of up to 15 tons, it was reduced to 3 tons shortly before its replacement in 1997 by the "New Penobscot Bridge."

The bridge carried U.S. Route 1A and Route 15 across the Penobscot River. While 1A still crosses the New Penobscot Bridge, SR-15 was redirected over I-395's Veterans Remembrance Bridge after its completion in 1986.

See also
List of bridges documented by the Historic American Engineering Record in Maine
List of bridges in the United States

References

Gallery

External links

Truss bridges in the United States
Buildings and structures in Bangor, Maine
Historic American Engineering Record in Maine
Road bridges in Maine
Buildings and structures in Brewer, Maine
Transportation buildings and structures in Penobscot County, Maine
Bridges completed in 1902
1902 establishments in Maine
1997 disestablishments in Maine